In interferometry, the zero spacing flux is the integrated flux density of the sources in the field of view.

See also 
 CLEAN (algorithm)

External links 
 The problem of short spacings
 An important subset: The zero spacing
 Zero-spacing Problem

Interferometry